Sofiyska Sveta gora Metro Station is a station on the Sofia Metro in Bulgaria. It started operation on 2 April 2015.

Interchange with other public transport
 City Bus service: 10

Location

References

External links
 Sofia Metropolitan
 SofiaMetro@UrbanRail
 Sofia Urban Mobility Center
 Sofia Metro station projects

Sofia Metro stations
Railway stations opened in 2015
2015 establishments in Bulgaria